The list of shipwrecks in 1970 includes ships that sank, foundered, grounded, or were otherwise lost during 1970.

January

1 January

5 January

6 January

10 January

18 January

22 January

26 January

27 January

29 January

February

3 February

4 February

6 February

7 February

9 February

10 February

17 February

19 February

Unknown date

March

2 March

4 March

6 March

9 March

12 March

13 March

18 March

20 March

22 March

27 March

31 March

April

1 April

9 April

12 April

13 April

19 April

20 April

21 April

May

2 May

4 May

5 May

8 May

10 May

13 May

14 May

15 May

16 May

29 May

Unknown date

June

7 June

9 June

11 June

15 June

17 June

18 June

19 June

26 June

July

1 July

4 July

11 July

12 July

14 July

15 July

20 July

21 July

25 July

30 July

31 July

August

1 August

7 August

8 August

13 August

14 August

18 August

19 August

20 August

21 August

29 August

Unknown date

September

1 September

3 September

4 September

7 September

16 September

18 September

23 September

26 September

Unknown date

October

1 October

3 October

9 October

10 October

17 October

20 October

23 October

26 October

28 October

29 October

November

6 November

17 November

19 November

21 November

22 November

28 November

Unknown date

December

2 December

3 December

17 December

25 December

Unknown date

Unknown date

References

See also

1970
 
Ships